Tristin Mays (born June 10, 1990) is an American actress. Mays portrayed Riley Davis in the reboot of the MacGyver series on CBS who works as a covert operative for the Phoenix Foundation.

Early life and education
Mays' parents, Viveca and Michael Mays, worked as an artist and in the military, respectively. She grew up in New York City until 2003 when her family moved to Moreno Valley, California, where she graduated from Vista del Lago High School. Her older brother Jeryn is also an actor.

Career
While best known for her role as Riley Davis on the 2016 TV series MacGyver, Mays has played in television series including as Shaina in the Nickelodeon series Gullah Gullah Island and as Robin Dixon, the daughter of Marcus Dixon, Carl Lumbly's character in Alias.

Her other television credits include  Ned's Declassified School Survival Guide, Everybody Hates Chris, True Jackson, VP, Zeke and Luther, Big Time Rush, Victorious and The Vampire Diaries.

As a seven-year-old in 1997, she joined the cast of Gullah Gullah Island, replacing Shaina M. Freeman as Shaina. That same year, she was cast as Nala in The Lion King on Broadway. She subsequently played Fan in Dickens' A Christmas Carol. In 2009, she was a series regular in the web series Private based on the novels of the same name. In 2011, she starred in the internet sitcom FAIL with fellow Gullah Gullah Island co-star Vanessa Baden. She also appeared in the TV show Impractical Jokers Season 8 Episode 4.

Filmography

References

External links
 
 

1990 births
Living people
20th-century American actresses
21st-century American actresses
Actresses from New Orleans
African-American actresses
American child actresses
American film actresses
American stage actresses
American television actresses
American web series actresses
20th-century African-American women
20th-century African-American people
21st-century African-American women
21st-century African-American people